Bugat may refer to:

Places
 Bugat, Bayan-Ölgii, western Mongolia
 Bugat, Bulgan, northern Mongolia
 Bugat, Govi-Altai, western Mongolia

Other
 Bugat (Trojan horse), a computer malware
 Dridex, a banking trojan that is also known as Bugat